Armando de Souza Marçal, better known as Marçalzinho (born 17 December 1956) is a Brazilian percussionist.

Biography 
Marçal started in music at 14. As the son of Mestre Marçal (1930-1994) who operated the largest Brazilian samba school GRES Portela from 1978 to 1986, while his grandfather, Armando Marçal was a famous samba composer and formed a famous samba duo together with Alcebíades Bide Barcelos.

In the United States Marcal worked with artists such as Pat Metheny and Paul Simon. In Brazil he worked alongside big names in Brazilian popular music, such as Gal Costa, Jorge Ben Jor, Veloso, John Bosco, Djavan, Vanessa da Mata, Chico Buarque, 'Blitz', Ivan Lins and Elis Regina. He was introduced to percussion in Paralamas do Sucesso and was also a member of the band 'Lulu'.

Discography

Solo albums 
 2007: Lado a Lado (Tratore)

Collaborations 
With Julio Iglesias
 1985: Libra (Sony)

With Pat Metheny Group
 1987: Still Life (Talking) (Geffen)
 1989: Letter from Home (Geffen)
 1993: The Road to You (Geffen), recorded live in Europe

With Pat Metheny
 1992: Secret Story (Geffen)

With Stephan Remmler
 1988: Lotto (Mercury)

With Djavan
 1989: Djavan (Discos CBS)

With Paul Simon
 1991: The Rhythm of the Saints (Warner Bros)
 1993: The Paul Simon Anthology (Warner Bros.)

With Matt Bianco
 1991: Samba in Your Casa (East West)

With Lio
 2005: Pop Model (ZE)

With Ivan Lins
 2007: Saudades de Casa (Warner Music Latina)

With Stefano Bollani
 2008: Carioca (EmArcy)

With João Bosco
 2014: Samba Fever (ARC)

References

External links 
 Dictionary Cravo Albin

1956 births
Living people
Musicians from Rio de Janeiro (city)
Brazilian percussionists